A playne and godly Exposytion or Declaration of the Commune Crede is a 1533 work of religious commentary by Desiderius Erasmus, written at the request of Thomas Boleyn, 1st Earl of Wiltshire, and dealing with the Apostles' Creed from a Roman Catholic point of view. It was written in part as a result of the dispute between Erasmus and Martin Luther on certain aspects of the nature of the Catholic Creed.

The Exposytion of the Commune Creed was published as an English translation of Erasmus's original text. It carried the subtitle "A Dialog called the Symbole or instructyon in the christen fayth or belyue, made by Mayster Erasmus of Roterdame. The persones speakynge, are the Mayster, and the Disciple, the one is marked by M the other by D." In effect it is a question-and-answer dialog, between a disciple wishing "to be ascrybed and receiued into the company and feloshype of the catholyke churche" and a master, on the common creed necessary. It therefore represents the catechism of Erasmus on the Catholic creed at the time of its writing, which was three years before his death in 1536.

Editions
It was first printed in 1533, "at the Requeste of the moste honorable lorde, Thomas Erle of Wyltshyre: father to the moste gragious and vertuous Quene Anne to our most gracyous lorde kynge Henry the .viii."

A reprint of this work using Roman instead of Gothic type with page 178 labeled as 187 was produced at a later unknown date.

References

1533 books
16th-century Christian texts
Books by Desiderius Erasmus